Società Sportiva Calcio Napoli is an Italian professional association football club based in Naples. The club was formed in 1926 as Associazione Calcio Napoli, a name it retained until 1964, when the current name was adopted. The team has played at the San Paolo Stadium since 1959. SSC Napoli have won Serie A twice, the Coppa Italia six times and the UEFA Cup once.

The list encompasses the major honours won by Napoli, records set by the club, their managers and their players, and details of their performance in European competition. The player records section itemises the club's leading goalscorers and those who have made most appearances in first-team competitions.

Honours
Napoli have won honours both domestically and in European competitions. Their first silverware was the Coppa Italia, which they won in 1962. They won their first scudetto in the 1986–87 season, and two seasons later they won the UEFA Cup.

Napoli's achievements include the following:

European
 UEFA Cup
Winners (1): 1988–89

 Anglo-Italian League Cup
Winners (1): 1976

 Coppa delle Alpi
Winners (1): 1966

Domestic
 Serie A
Winners (2): 1986–87, 1989–90 
 Coppa Italia
Winners (6): 1961–62, 1975–76, 1986–87, 2011–12, 2013–14, 2019–20
 Supercoppa Italiana
Winners (2): 1990, 2014
 Serie B
Winners (2): 1945–46 (Serie A-B Southern Italy co-champions with Bari), 1949–50
 Serie C1
Winners (1): 2005–06

Divisional movements

Player records

Most appearances
Slovakian midfielder Marek Hamšík is the player with the most appearances for Napoli with 520 in all competitions; he also holds the record for most appearances in league competition with 408, and UEFA competitions with 80.

Competitive matches only, including substitutes.

Notes

Goalscorers

Most goals scored in all competitions: 148, Dries Mertens
Most goals scored in league matches: 113, Dries Mertens
Most goals scored in Serie A: 113, Dries Mertens
Most goals scored in Coppa Italia: 29, Diego Maradona 
Most goals scored in European competition: 28, Dries Mertens
Most goals scored in a season in all competitions: 38, Edinson Cavani in 2012–13 and Gonzalo Higuaín in 2015–16
Most league goals in a Serie A season: 36, Gonzalo Higuaín in 2015–16.
Most league goals in a Serie B season: 22, Stefan Schwoch in 1999–2000.
Most league goals in a Serie C season: 18, Emanuele Calaiò in 2004–05.
Most goals in a competitive match: 5, Attila Sallustro against Reggiana, in the 1928–29 Divisione Nazionale, and Daniel Fonseca against Valencia, in the 1992–93 UEFA Cup.

Top goalscorers
On 13 June 2020, in a Coppa Italia match against Internazionale, Dries Mertens scored his 122nd Napoli goal, becoming the player with the most goals for the club.

Competitive matches only.

Notes

International honours won while playing at Napoli

FIFA World Cup
The following players have won the FIFA World Cup while playing for Napoli:
 Giuseppe Cavanna – 1934
 Diego Maradona – 1986

UEFA European Championship
The following players have won the UEFA European Championship while playing for Napoli:
 Antonio Juliano – 1968
 Dino Zoff – 1968
 Alex Meret – 2020
 Giovanni Di Lorenzo – 2020
 Lorenzo Insigne – 2020
The following players have won the Copa America while playing for Napoli:
 Edinson Cavani – Copa America 2011

Olympic Games
The following players have won a gold medal in football at the Olympic Games while playing for Napoli:
 Ezequiel Lavezzi – 2008
 Nicolás Navarro – 2008

Record transfer fees

The highest transfer fee received by the club for a player was €90 million, paid by Juventus for Gonzalo Higuaín on 27 July 2016.
The highest transfer fee paid by the club for a player was €70 million, paid to Lille for Victor Osimhen on 31 July 2020.

Managerial records

Fritz Kreutzer was Napoli's manager in the first season of the club's history. The Austrian midfielder spent one season at Napoli as a player-manager. The longest serving manager by number of matches is Eraldo Monzeglio, who managed Napoli from 1949 to 1956, for a total of 236 matches.

Competitive matches only.

Notes

Club records

Goals
Most league goals scored in a season: 94 in 38 matches (2016–17)
Fewest league goals scored in a season: 18 in 30 matches (1972–73)
Most league goals conceded in a season: 76 in 34 matches (1997–98)
Fewest league goals conceded in a season: 19 in 30 matches (1970–71)

Points
Most points in a season:
Two points for a win: 51 in 34 matches (1989–90)
Three points for a win: 91 in 38 matches (2017–18)

Matches

Record wins
Record home win: 
Napoli 8–1 Pro Patria (Serie A, 16 October 1955)

Record away win:
Bologna 1–7 Napoli (Serie A, 4 February 2017)

Record European win:
Ajax 1–6 Napoli (Champions League, 4 October 2022)

Record defeats

Record away defeat:
Torino 11–0 Napoli (Divisione Nazionale, 4 March 1928)
Roma 8–0 Napoli (Serie A, 29 March 1959)

Record consecutive results
Record consecutive wins: 13 (30 April 2017 to 14 October 2017)
Record consecutive defeats: 6 (1997–98)
Record consecutive matches without a defeat: 19 (4 March 2017 to 26 November 2017)
Record consecutive wins from the beginning of a league season: 8 (2017–18 and 2021–22)

Statistics in European football

References

Napoli
records and statistics